The 2012 Northern Ireland Milk Cup is the 30th edition of the international football tournament which takes place annually in the north coast of Northern Ireland, and attracts competitors from across the globe. There are three sections to the tournament, the Elite Section (U19), the Premier Section (U17) and the Junior Section (U15).

Elite section

Squads

Group stage

Fifth-place playoff

Third-place playoff

Final

Premier section

Group stage

Knock-out stage

Plate

Semi-finals

Third-place play-off

Final

Bowl

Semi-finals

Third-place play-off

Final

Vase

Semi-finals

Third-place play-off

Final

Globe

Semi-finals

Third-place play-off

Final

Milk Cup

Semi-finals

Third-place play-off

Final

External links
Official site

Milk Cup
SuperCupNI
Milk